Hypochalcia griseoaenella is a species of snout moth in the genus Hypochalcia. It was described by Émile Louis Ragonot in 1887. It was described from the Tarbagatai Mountains.

The wingspan is about 25 mm.

References

Moths described in 1887
Phycitini